The Men's 5000 metres competition at the 2017 World Single Distances Speed Skating Championships was held on 9 February 2017.

Results
The race started at 18:38.

References

Men's 5000 metres